Three Little Sew and Sews is a 1939 short subject directed by Del Lord starring American slapstick comedy team The Three Stooges (Moe Howard, Larry Fine and Curly Howard). It is the 36th entry in the series released by Columbia Pictures starring the comedians, who released 190 shorts for the studio between 1934 and 1959.

Plot
The Stooges are sailors employed in a naval base tailor shop. Curly steals Admiral Taylor (James C. Morton)'s uniform in order to pursue and flirter women. While pretending to be an Admiral, Curly and his "aides" (Moe and Larry) are tricked into stealing and hijacking a submarine by a pair of evil spies, Count Alfred Gehrol (Harry Semels) and Miss Olga Arvin (Phyllis Barry) who work for a fictional government from a fictional country. The Stooges eventually capture the spies, but whilst reenacting the capture for the real Admiral, Curly accidentally detonates a bomb. The short ends with the Stooges, now angels ascending to heaven, being chased by an angry Admiral, who is also now an angel.

Cast

Credited

Production notes
Three Little Sew and Sews was filmed on March 21–24, 1938, and was the last entry to utilize "Listen to the Mockingbird" as the Stooges' official theme song. It was filmed directly after Violent Is the Word for Curly but before Flat Foot Stooges, the latter being the first film to employ "Three Blind Mice" as the Stooges' official theme song.

The title Sew and Sew is a euphemism on "so and so," a softly worded insult for a person one finds unimpressionable. (generally a "son-of-a-bitch").

Three Little Sew and Sews is one of several Stooge shorts in which a sofa spring manages to become attached to someone's backside. This gag was also used in Hoi Polloi, An Ache in Every Stake, Hugs and Mugs and Have Rocket, Will Travel. In addition, footage of war scenes were later used in Boobs in Arms and They Stooge to Conga. The short is also the fifth of sixteen Stooge shorts with the word "three" in the title.

Unlike most Stooge films, Three Little Sew and Sews ends with the trio being killed. This plot device was only used in a handful of their shorts, among them being You Nazty Spy!, I'll Never Heil Again and Half Shot Shooters.

References

External links 
 
 

1939 films
The Three Stooges films
American black-and-white films
1939 comedy films
Military humor in film
Films directed by Del Lord
Columbia Pictures short films
American slapstick comedy films
1930s English-language films
1930s American films